Isyangildino (İśängilde) is a rural locality (a village) in Tselinny Selsoviet, Khaybullinsky District, Bashkortostan, Russia. The population was 486 as of 2010. There are 7 streets.

Geography 
Isyangildino is located 63 km northeast of Akyar (the district's administrative centre) by road. Ishmukhametovo and Abdulnasyrovo are the nearest rural localities.

References 

Rural localities in Khaybullinsky District